Lenormant is a French surname. Notable people with the surname include:

 Charles Lenormant (1802–1859), French archaeologist
 François Lenormant (1837–1883), French assyriologist and archaeologist

See also
 Lenormand, a surname

French-language surnames